Renal reabsorption of sodium (Na+) is a part of renal physiology. It uses Na-H antiport, Na-glucose symport, sodium ion channels (minor). It is stimulated by angiotensin II and aldosterone, and inhibited by atrial natriuretic peptide.

It is very efficient, since more than 25,000 mmoles/day of sodium is filtered into the nephron, but only ~100 mmoles/day, or less than 0.4% remains in the final urine.

Proximal tubule
Most of the reabsorption (65%) occurs in the proximal tubule. In the latter part it is favored by an electrochemical driving force, but initially it needs the cotransporter SGLT and the Na-H antiporter. Sodium passes along an electrochemical gradient (passive transport) from the lumen into the tubular cell, together with water and chloride which also diffuse passively. Water is reabsorbed to the same degree, resulting in the concentration in the end of the proximal tubule being the same as in the beginning. In other words, the reabsorption in the proximal tubule is isosmotic.

Loop of Henle
Sodium is reabsorbed in the thick ascending limb of loop of Henle, by Na-K-2Cl symporter and
Na-H antiporter. It goes against its chemical driving force, but the high electrical driving force renders the overall electrochemical driving force positive anyway, availing some sodium to diffuse passively either the transcellular or paracellular way.

Distal tubule
In the distal convoluted tubule sodium is transported against an electrochemical gradient by sodium-chloride symporters.

Collecting duct
The principal cells are the sodium-transporting cells in the collecting duct system.

Regulation
Although  only a fragment of total reabsorption happens here, it is the main part of intervention. This is e.g. done by endogenous production of aldosterone, increasing reabsorption. Since the normal excretion rate of sodium is ~100mmoles/day, then a regulation of the absorption of still more than 1000 mmoles/day entering the collecting duct system has a substantial influence of the total sodium excreted.

Overview table

References

Renal physiology